The 1994 Utah Utes football team represented the University of Utah as a member of the Western Athletic Conference (WAC) during the 1994 NCAA Division I-A football season. In their fifth season under head coach Ron McBride, the Utes compiled an overall record of 10–2 record with a mark of 6–2 against conference opponents, placing in a three-way tie for second in the WAC, and outscored their opponents 426 to 210. Utah was invited to the Freedom Bowl, where they beat Arizona. The team played home games at Robert Rice Stadium in Salt Lake City.

The 1994 season was the most successful during McBride's tenure at Utah. The Utes beat three ranked teams and finished the season ranked No. 10 in the AP Poll and No. 8 in the Coaches Poll.

Schedule

Roster

Game summaries

Oregon

Freedom Bowl

After the season

NFL Draft
Four Utah players were selected in the 1995 NFL Draft, including first rounder and future pro bowler Luther Elliss.

References

Utah
Utah Utes football seasons
Freedom Bowl champion seasons
Utah Utes football